Konstantin Gruber-Zamarripa (born 27 October 1979) is an Austrian former professional tennis player.

Gruber, a native of Vienna, turned professional in 1999 and reached a career high singles ranking of 397 during his career. He made a Davis Cup appearance in 2003, when he beat Norway's Stian Boretti in Oslo to give Austria a 5–0 sweep of the tie. In 2004 he featured in the main draw of an ATP Tour tournament for the only time, at the 2004 BA-CA-TennisTrophy in Vienna, where he was beaten in the first round by Taylor Dent.

ITF Futures titles

Singles: (3)

Doubles: (1)

See also
List of Austria Davis Cup team representatives

References

External links
 
 
 

1979 births
Living people
Austrian male tennis players
Tennis players from Vienna